Ribwort is a common name for several plants and may refer to:
 Plantago asiatica
 Plantago lanceolata
 Plantago major